Ludvig Dmitrievich Faddeev (also Ludwig Dmitriyevich; ; 23 March 1934 – 26 February 2017) was a Soviet and Russian mathematical physicist. He is known for the discovery of the Faddeev equations in the theory of the quantum mechanical three-body problem and for the development of path integral methods in the quantization of non-abelian gauge field theories, including the introduction (with Victor Popov) of Faddeev–Popov ghosts.  He led the Leningrad School, in which he along with many of his students developed the quantum inverse scattering method for studying quantum integrable systems in one space and one time dimension.  This work led to the invention of quantum groups by Drinfeld and Jimbo.

Biography
Faddeev was born in Leningrad to a family of mathematicians. His father,  Dmitry Faddeev, was a well known algebraist, professor of Leningrad University and member of the Russian Academy of Sciences.  His mother, Vera Faddeeva, was known for her work in numerical linear algebra.  Faddeev attended Leningrad University, receiving his undergraduate degree in 1956.  He enrolled in physics, rather than mathematics, "to be independent of [his] father".  Nevertheless, he received a solid education in mathematics as well "due to the influence of V. A. Fock and V. I. Smirnov".  His doctoral work, on scattering theory, was completed in 1959 under the direction of Olga Ladyzhenskaya.

From 1976 to 2000, Faddeev was head of the St. Petersburg Department of Steklov Institute of Mathematics of Russian Academy of Sciences (PDMI RAS). 
He was an invited visitor to the CERN Theory Division for the first time in 1973 and made several further visits there.

In 1988 he founded the Euler International Mathematical Institute, now a department of PDMI RAS.

Honours and awards
Faddeev was a member of the Russian Academy of Sciences since 1976,
and was a member of a number of foreign academies, including the U. S. National Academy of Sciences, the French Academy of Sciences, the Austrian Academy of Sciences, the Brazilian Academy of Sciences, the Royal Swedish Academy of Sciences and the Royal Society.
He received numerous honors including USSR State Prize (1971), Dannie Heineman Prize (1975), Dirac Prize (1990), an honorary doctorate from the Faculty of Mathematics and Science at Uppsala University, Sweden, Max Planck Medal (1996), Demidov Prize (2002 – "For outstanding contribution to the development of mathematics, quantum mechanics, string theory and solitons") and the State Prize of the Russian Federation (1995, 2004).  He was president of the International Mathematical Union (1986–1990). He was awarded the Henri Poincaré Prize in 2006 and the Shaw Prize in mathematical sciences in 2008. Also the Karpinsky International Prize and the Max Planck Medal (German Physical Society).
He also received the Lomonosov Gold Medal for 2013.

Faddeev also received state awards:
 Order of Merit for the Fatherland;
 3rd class (25 October 2004) – for outstanding contribution to the development of fundamental and applied domestic science and many years of fruitful activity
 4th class (4 June 1999) – for outstanding contribution to the development of national science and training of highly qualified personnel in connection with the 275th anniversary of the Russian Academy of Sciences
 Order of Friendship (6 June 1994) – for his great personal contribution to the development of mathematical physics and training of highly qualified scientific personnel
 Order of Lenin
 Order of the Red Banner of Labour
 State Prize of the Russian Federation in Science and Technology 2004 (6 June 2005), for outstanding achievement in the development of mathematical physics and in 1995 for science and technology (20 June 1995), for the monograph "Introduction to quantum gauge field theory"
 USSR State Prize (1971)
 Honorary citizen of St. Petersburg (2010)
 Academician (Finland) (1991)

Selected works
Source:

Notes

References

 
 L. A. Takhtajan et al., Scientific heritage of L. D. Faddeev. Review of works, Russian Mathematical Surveys (2017), 72 (6):977,

External links
 
 faddeev.com

1934 births
2017 deaths
Scientists from Saint Petersburg
Russian inventors
Soviet mathematicians
Soviet physicists
20th-century Russian physicists
Members of the French Academy of Sciences
Donegall Lecturers of Mathematics at Trinity College Dublin
Full Members of the USSR Academy of Sciences
Full Members of the Russian Academy of Sciences
Foreign associates of the National Academy of Sciences
Foreign Members of the Royal Society
Foreign members of the Chinese Academy of Sciences
Members of the Finnish Academy of Science and Letters
Recipients of the Order "For Merit to the Fatherland", 3rd class
Recipients of the Order of Honour (Russia)
State Prize of the Russian Federation laureates
Demidov Prize laureates
Recipients of the USSR State Prize
Recipients of the Order of Friendship of Peoples
Recipients of the Order of Lenin
Recipients of the Lomonosov Gold Medal
People associated with CERN
Winners of the Max Planck Medal
Presidents of the International Mathematical Union
Members of the Royal Swedish Academy of Sciences